Bucknall could be:

Places named Bucknall
Bucknall, Lincolnshire
Bucknall, Staffordshire, a suburb of Stoke-on-Trent

People named Bucknall
Benjamin Bucknall, (1833–1895) English architect of the Gothic Revival in England and Wales, and neo-Moorish architecture in Algeria.
Frederick Estcourt Bucknall (1835 – 1896) was an English-born publican, brewer and politician in the colony of South Australia.
Henry Bucknall (1885-1962), British rower.
Gerard Bucknall (1894-1980), British World War II general.
James Bucknall (b. 1958) British general and Deputy Commander ISAF
Steve Bucknall (b. 1966), English basketball player.
David Bucknall (1939-2015), British Quantity Surveyor
James Bucknall Bucknall Estcourt, (1803-1855), was a major-general and MP.
Thomas Bucknall-Estcourt, was a British Conservative politician.
Thomas Grimston Bucknall Estcourt, English Politician.
George Bucknall-Estcourt, English Politician.
Roger Bucknall, luthier.
Henry Bucknall Betterton, English Politician.
Harry Bucknall (1965-), British writer best known for books In the Dolphin's Wake and Like a Tramp Like a Pilgrim.
Anthony Launce Bucknall (1945-), a former England international rugby union player and captain.
Cedric Bucknall, (1849-1921), English organist and botanist.
Thomas Bucknall 18th century English shipbuilder for the Royal Navy
Sir William Bucknall (1633-1676), English politician.
William Bucknall, 1750–1814,  English politician. Known before 1797 as William Grimston.
Thomas Bucknall Lloyd, 1824 - 1896 was Archdeacon of Salop from 1886 until his death.

See also
Bucknell (disambiguation)